Killer cell lectin-like receptor subfamily B, member 1, also known as KLRB1, NKR-P1A or CD161 (cluster of differentiation 161), is a human gene.

Function 

Natural killer (NK) cells are lymphocytes that mediate cytotoxicity and secrete cytokines after immune stimulation. Several genes of the C-type lectin superfamily, including the rodent NKRP1 family of glycoproteins, are expressed by NK cells and may be involved in the regulation of NK cell function. The KLRB1 protein contains an extracellular domain with several motifs characteristic of C-type lectins, a transmembrane domain, and a cytoplasmic domain. The KLRB1 protein, NKR-P1A or CD161, is classified as a type II membrane protein because it has an external C terminus.  NKR-P1A, the receptor encoded by the KLRB1 gene, recognizes Lectin Like Transcript-1 (LLT1) as a functional ligand.

References

Further reading 

 
 
 
 
 
 
 
 
 
 
 
 
 
 
 
 
 

Clusters of differentiation